Ermera is one of the municipalities (formerly districts) of East Timor, located in the west-central part of the country. It has a population of 117,064 (Census 2010) and an area of 756.5 km².

Etymology
The word Ermera means 'red water' in the local Mambai language. It is said that the ancestors of today's inhabitants of the municipality originated from three mountains, namely Cailitlau, Lalimlau, and Hituria, and that the name Ermera refers to the red waters flowing from those mountains.

Geography

Ermera is one of only two land-locked municipalities in East Timor, the other being Aileu. It borders Liquiçá to the north, Dili to the northeast, Alieu to the east, Ainaro to the southeast, and Bobonaro to the west.

The boundaries of the municipality are identical to those of the district of the same name in Portuguese Timor.  Its capital is Gleno, which is located 30 km to the southwest of the national capital, Dili. The city of Ermera, also known as Vila Ermera, lies 58 km from the capital along the same road. In Marobo (Atsabe Administrative Post) are the remains of a hot springs bath from colonial times. The pool is still in use.

Administrative posts
The municipality's administrative posts (formerly sub-districts) are:
 Atsabe Administrative Post
 Ermera Administrative Post
 Hatulia Administrative Post
 Hatulia B Administrative Post
 Letefoho Administrative Post
 Railaco Administrative Post

The administrative posts are divided into 52 sucos ("villages") in total.

References

Notes

Bibliography

External links

  – official site (in Tetum with some content in English)
  – information page on Ministry of State Administration site 

 
Municipalities of East Timor